Detroit is the fourth mixtape by American rapper Big Sean. It was released for free download on September 5, 2012, by G.O.O.D. Music. Detroit features guest appearances from these fellow rappers such as J. Cole, Juicy J, King Chip, French Montana, Royce da 5'9", Kendrick Lamar and Tyga - along with track narrations by Common, Young Jeezy and Snoop Lion. Wale and Wiz Khalifa are also featured in the bonus tracks. American singers including Chris Brown, Jhené Aiko, James Fauntleroy and Mike Posner also make guest appearances on the mixtape. Production is by Hit-Boy, Da Internz, 808 Mafia's own producers Lex Luger and Southside and KeY Wane, among others. The mixtape primarily consisted of these completed original songs.

Detroit caused the mixtape site DatPiff to crash upon the mixtape's eventual release. It was viewed 1.5 million times on the day of release and was downloaded close to 700,000—with 500,000 downloads within three hours. Detroit has been downloaded over a million times.

On September 4, 2020, Big Sean released a sequel to the mixtape titled Detroit 2, as his fifth studio album.

On September 5, 2022, Big Sean re-released the mixtape on all streaming platforms.

Background 
On August 20, 2012, Big Sean first announced the mixtape via Twitter and a YouTube video, titled "Big Sean Mixtape Announcement 2012". Big Sean released three song previews in the shape of short music videos as promotion before the mixtape release; "How It Feel" on August 21, "24 Karats of Gold" on August 28 and "RWT" on September 4. Sean paid for the expenses of the videos himself. The title of the mixtape pays homage to Sean's hometown of Detroit.

Reception and accolades 
Detroit received widespread critical acclaim from music critics and fans, who hailed it as Sean's best work. The mixtape was named the 26th best album of 2012 by Complex magazine. It also won Best Mixtape at the 2013 BET Hip Hop Awards.

Track listing 

Notes
 On the original release, "Life Should Go On" and "All I Know" are put together on one track but are separated in the table.
 "Do What I Gotta Do" does not appear in the streaming version.
 "24K of Gold" interpolates lyrics from "If I Ruled the World (Imagine That)" by Nas.
 "How It Feel" contains a slight change in lyrics on the streaming version.

References 

2012 mixtape albums
Big Sean albums
Albums produced by Da Internz
Albums produced by Don Cannon
Albums produced by Hit-Boy
Albums produced by Lex Luger
Albums produced by Young Chop
Albums produced by Key Wane
Albums produced by Southside (record producer)